Stefan Eriksson (born 18 March 1962) is a Swedish diplomat, who was Ambassador of Sweden to Belarus in the period from 2008 to 2012. Prior to this, he served as the head of the Belarusian department of the Swedish Embassy in Moscow. In addition to his native Swedish language, he speaks English, French, German, Russian, and Belarusian. Eriksson is married and has three children.

In his role as the Ambassador, he showed solidarity with marginalized communities fighting for democracy in Belarus. In 2012, the Belarusian government expelled Eriksson from the country over his efforts in advocating democracy. In 2013 he was awarded the Mark Palmer Prize for his involvement in Belarus, and in 2019 - the Belarusian Democratic Republic Centenary Medal.

References

1962 births
Ambassadors of Sweden to Belarus
Stockholm School of Economics alumni
Living people
People from Västerås